The 2022 Open Rouen Capfinances Métropole was a professional tennis tournament played on indoor hard courts. It was the first edition of the tournament and part of the 2022 WTA 125 tournaments, offering a total of $115,000 in prize money. It took place at the Kindarena Sports Complex in Rouen, France between 17 and 23 October 2022.

Champions

Singles

  Maryna Zanevska def.  Viktorija Golubic 7–6(8–6), 6–1

Doubles

  Natela Dzalamidze /  Kamilla Rakhimova def.  Misaki Doi /  Oksana Kalashnikova 6–2, 7–5

Singles entrants

Seeds 

 1 Rankings are as of 10 October 2022.

Other entrants 
The following players received a wildcard into the singles main draw:
  Elsa Jacquemot
  Léolia Jeanjean
  Kristina Mladenovic
  Alice Robbe

The following players received entry into the main draw through qualification:
  Olga Danilović
  Anastasia Gasanova
  Caty McNally
  Jessika Ponchet

The following players received entry as lucky losers:
  Erika Andreeva
  Ana Konjuh

Withdrawals 
Before the tournament
  Anastasia Gasanova → replaced by  Erika Andreeva
  Kaja Juvan → replaced by  Daria Snigur
  Jule Niemeier → replaced by  Tamara Korpatsch
  Jasmine Paolini → replaced by  Kamilla Rakhimova
  Nuria Párrizas Díaz → replaced by  Harmony Tan
  Sara Sorribes Tormo → replaced by  Sara Errani
  Clara Tauson → replaced by  Vitalia Diatchenko
  Wang Xinyu → replaced by  Simona Waltert
  Wang Xiyu → replaced by  Ana Konjuh

Doubles entrants

Seeds 

 1 Rankings as of 10 October 2022.

Other entrants 
The following pair received a wildcard into the doubles main draw:
  Audrey Albié /  Alice Robbe

References

External links
 Official website

2022 WTA 125 tournaments
Tennis tournaments in France
2022 in French tennis
October 2022 sports events in France